The Aigrette-class submarines were a class of two submarines built for the French Navy between 1903 and 1905. They were essentially experimental submarines, and although in service during World War I, saw no action. The class was designed by Maxime Laubeuf and used Drzewiecki drop collar launchers and external cradles to launch torpedoes.

Design

Their complement was 14 men.

Their armament comprised two  Drzewiecki drop collar torpedo launchers and two  external cradles.

Ships

See also 
List of submarines of France

References

Citations 

World War I submarines of France
 
Ship classes of the French Navy